Jaladanki is a village in Nellore district of the Indian state of Andhra Pradesh. It is located in Jaladanki mandal of Kavali revenue division.

References

Villages in Nellore district